Eberhard Burger, OBE (born 26 July 1943 in Berlin) is a German civil engineer. He is particularly active in Dresden, overseeing construction of the new Zionskirche and serving as Director of Construction for the rebuilding of the Frauenkirche from 1996 to 2005 and from 2001 to present as chairman of the Dresden Frauenkirche Foundation (Stiftung Frauenkirche Dresden). He was granted the Großes Bundesverdienstkreuz on 7 September 2007, then made an OBE in November 2007 "in recognition of his contributions to the reconstruction of the Frauenkirche and his significant contribution to the reconciliation of [the British and German] peoples in this project".

External links 

  Freeman of the City of Dresden
  65th birthday article

Bibliography
 Eberhard Burger, Jörg Schöner; Die Frauenkirche zu Dresden, 2001,

References

Officers of the Order of the British Empire
Commanders Crosses of the Order of Merit of the Federal Republic of Germany
Recipients of the Order of Merit of the Free State of Saxony
Living people
1943 births
People from Berlin
Engineers from Dresden
German civil engineers